Močila is a small settlement in the Municipality of Kanal ob Soči in western Slovenia. Until 2007, the area was part of the settlement of Anhovo. The settlement is part of the traditional region of the Slovenian Littoral and is included in the Gorizia Statistical Region.

References

External links
Močila on Geopedia

Populated places in the Municipality of Kanal
2007 establishments in Slovenia